Forestville Dam could refer to:

 The dam and millpond in Forestville, Wisconsin
 The dam on the Dead River (Michigan)